Vladimir Vladimirovich Kaminsky (born 18 April 1950) is a retired Soviet cyclist. He was part of the Soviet team that won the 100 km team time trial at the 1976 Summer Olympics and 1977 UCI Road World Championships and finished second at the world championships in 1974, 1975 and 1978. 

He won a national title before the 1980 Olympics, but was not selected because of age. After retirement he defended a PhD in cycling and worked with the Soviet national team. He later taught at the Belarusian State University of Physical Training and worked as a cycling coach. Between 1996 and 1999 he headed the national team of Belarus.

His two elder brothers, Leonid and Anatoly, are also retired cyclists.

References

1950 births
Living people
Olympic cyclists of the Soviet Union
Olympic gold medalists for the Soviet Union
Cyclists at the 1976 Summer Olympics
Olympic medalists in cycling
Soviet male cyclists
Cyclists from Minsk
UCI Road World Champions (elite men)
Medalists at the 1976 Summer Olympics